The 1980 Alan King Tennis Classic, also known as the Alan King-Ceasers Palace Tennis Classic, was a men's tennis tournament played on outdoor hard courts at the Caesars Palace in Las Vegas, United States. It was the ninth edition of the event and was part of the 1980 Volvo Grand Prix circuit. The tournament was held from April 21 through April 27, 1980. First-seeded Björn Borg won the singles title and the accompanying $60,000 first-prize money. It was Borg's second successive singles title at the tournament.

Finals

Singles
 Björn Borg defeated  Harold Solomon 6–3, 6–1
 It was Borg's 5th singles title of the year and the 57th of his career.

Doubles
 Bob Lutz /  Stan Smith defeated  Wojciech Fibak /  Gene Mayer 6–2, 7–5

References

External links
 ITF tournament edition details

Alan King Tennis Classic
Alan King Tennis Classic
Tennis in Las Vegas
Alan King Tennis Classic
Alan King Tennis Classic
Alan King Tennis Classic